San Uk Tsai may refer to:
 San Uk Tsai (North District), a village in North District, Hong Kong
 San Uk Tsai (Tai Po District), a village in Tai Po District, Hong Kong